The XIII Mediterranean Games, commonly known as the 1997 Mediterranean Games, were the 13th Mediterranean Games. The Games were held in Bari, Italy, from 13 to 25 June 1997, where 2,956 athletes (2,166 men and 790 women) from 21 countries participated. There were a total of 234 medal events from 27 different sports.

Participating nations
The following is a list of nations that participated in the 1997 Mediterranean Games:

Sports

Medal table

External links
 Mediterranean Games Athletics results at Gbrathletics.com
 1997 – BARI (ITA) at CIJM web site

 
M
M
Multi-sport events in Italy
Mediterranean Games
Mediterranean Games by year
Sport in Bari
Mediterranean Games